Herbert John Pulman (12 December 192325 December 1998) was an English professional snooker player who was the World Snooker Champion from 1957 to 1968. He won the title at the 1957 Championship, and retained it across seven challenges from 1964 to 1968, three of them against Fred Davis and two against Rex Williams. When the tournament reverted to a knockout event in 1969 he lost 18–25 in the first round to the eventual champion John Spencer, and he was runner-up to Ray Reardon in 1970. He never reached the final again, although he was a losing semi-finalist in 1977.

Having won the English Amateur Championship in 1946, Pulman turned professional, and achieved three News of the World Snooker Tournament titles, in 1954, 1957, and 1958. He became a television commentator towards the end of his playing career, and retired from competitive play in 1981 after breaking his leg in a traffic accident. He died in 1998 after a fall down stairs at his home.

Early life 
Herbert John Pulman, known as John Pulman, was born on 12 December 1923 in Teignmouth, Devonshire, England. Pulman's father bought a billiard hall with two tables after selling his bakery and confectionery business in 1929. Pulman started playing billiards at the age of nine, and made his first billiards  aged twelve. He attended Exeter Episcopal School, and was a schoolboy swimming champion, also representing Exeter at water polo. In 1938, he entered the British Boys Billiards Championship, but left his cue on the train on his way to the event at Burroughes Hall. He was allowed to pick a cue from a selection at the venue, and used that cue for the rest of his career.

In his first match with the cue, against Barrie Smith, Pulman was 199–196 ahead in a 200-up match when he . Barrie then got the points he needed to win. The cue that Pulman chose included a metal plate mentioning Sidney Smith, and Pulman filed Smith's name off when he became a professional, as he felt he could not play exhibitions using a cue with another professional's name on it. During World War II, Pulman was enlisted in the army for three months, making Spitfire wings.

Career

Early professional career (1946–1955) 
Pulman won the 1946 English Amateur Championship title, with a 5–3 win over Albert Brown in the final, and turned professional shortly afterwards. In 1947 he had his first appearance at the World Snooker Championship, losing 14–21 to Brown in the first round of qualification. He lost 29–42 to Clark McConachy in the first round of the main draw. In the 1948 Sunday Empire News Tournament he won the qualifying event and finished second in the main event behind Joe Davis. Pulman won a total of £400; £150 for the qualifying and £250 for finishing second.

At the start of his professional career, Pulman lived at the house of his patron Bill Lampard, a confectioner from Bristol. Lampard built a billiard room where Pulman could practise. Snooker historian Clive Everton claims that this arrangement ended after Pulman was discovered in bed with Lampard's wife.

World snooker championship contests (1955–1968)  
He first reached the final of the World Professional Match-play Championship in 1955, by defeating Rex Williams 22–15 in the quarter-final and Alec Brown in the semi-final. He lost the final, played at Blackpool Tower Circus, 35–38 to Fred Davis. Davis had taken a 10–2 lead after the first day but Pulman had narrowed the gap, at 15–9, by the end of the second day of play. Davis led 20–16 after day three, 27–21 after day 4 and 33–27 after day 5. Davis won the title on the sixth day. Pulman made three century breaks in the final, 103 on day 2, another 103 on day 4 and 101 in the very last frame.

Davis beat him again in the 1956 final, at 33–37, with the score finishing at 35–38 after "dead"  (i.e. frames played after a player has achieved a winning margin). Davis was not among the four entrants for the 1957 tournament. Pulman was level at 12–12 with Williams in the semi-final before winning at 19–16 and also taking the two dead frames. In the final, Pulman trailed Jack Rea at 2–4, 5–8 and 8–11, before equalising at 11–11. Rea then opened up a lead again to leave Pulman 15–20 behind. Pulman took four successive frames to narrow his deficit to 19–20, going on to take the lead 24–22, and then start the final day 32–27 in front. He won the title at 37–29, and the score finished at 39–34 after dead frames. The tournament received little media coverage, and the championship was not staged again for another seven years.

In 1964, the Conayes £200 Professional Tournament was staged at the Rex Williams Snooker Centre in Blackheath, being the first commercially sponsored professional snooker event since 1960. Pulman was one of the four competitors, along with Williams, Davis, and Jack Rea, and won the event. Williams was the driving force behind the revival of the World Snooker Championship in 1964, obtaining sanction for the competition after taking the Billiards Association and Control Council (BA&CC) chairman Harold Phillips out to lunch. The championship was staged on a challenge basis, with the first match being scheduled between Pulman, the winner of the 1957 Championship, and Davis. Pulman beat Davis 19–16 at Burroughes Hall in April 1964.

In October 1964, Williams challenged Pulman for the title. The match was played over 73 frames, and took place from 12 to 17 October at Burroughes Hall. Williams led 8–4 at the end of the first day but Pulman won 11 of the 12 frames on the second day to lead 15–9. Pulman extended his lead to 31–17 after four days and won the match on the fifth day, taking a 37–23 winning lead. The remaining 13 dead frames were played on the final day with Pulman finishing 40–33 ahead.

In March 1965, Pulman retained his title in the deciding frame by defeating challenger Davis 37–36, winning the last two frames from 35 to 36 behind. Williams and Pulman met again in late 1965 in a series of short matches in South Africa, with Pulman winning by 25 matches to 22. At one venue where no spectators were present, the players reportedly spun a coin instead of playing the match to determine the winner. Also in 1965, Pulman defeated another challenger, Fred Van Rensburg 39–12.

Davis challenged Pulman for a third time in 1966, in a series of seven best-of-five-frames matches. Pulman won the series at four matches to Davis' two and took the final match as well to win by five matches to two. In 1968, Pulman won the title for the eighth time by seeing off the challenge of Eddie Charlton. Charlton led 16–14 after thirty frames. Pulman then took five of the next six frames, three of them on the black, to leave Charlton 17–19 behind. Pulman went on to reach a winning margin at 37–28, and finished 39–34 ahead after dead frames.

Later career and retirement (1968–1998) 
Pulman had been touring snooker clubs as promotional work for the tobacco brand John Player, and the company had sponsored his 1968 match against Charlton. The good attendances for the championship match led to John Player deciding to sponsor the 1969 World Snooker Championship as a knockout tournament. This championship is generally regarded as the start of the modern snooker era.

Pulman failed to defend his title, losing 18–25 to the eventual champion John Spencer in the first round. He reached the final in 1970 but lost 33–37 to Ray Reardon, having earlier recovered from 14–27 to 33–34. In 1971 he failed to qualify from the round-robin stages that determined the semi-finalists, and in 1972 he lost 23–31 to eventual champion Alex Higgins in the quarter-finals. Pulman did not reach as far as the quarter-finals at the world championship until 1977, the first time the event was held at the Crucible Theatre in Sheffield. Pulman reached the semi-finals with wins over Fred Davis and Graham Miles before losing 16–18 to Spencer, the eventual winner. After 1977, he did not win any further world championship matches. He reached the final of the 1977 Pontins Professional event, where he also lost to Spencer, 5–7. After snooker world rankings were introduced in 1976, Pulman achieved his highest placing of seventh in the 1977/1978 list.

He was adjudged bankrupt on 7 February 1979 with debts of £5,916. By this time he was recently divorced, suffering from severe motivational problems and living in a hotel in Bromley. He retired from professional play in 1981, after breaking his leg when hit by a London bus and being hospitalised for six months. He later said that he had already lost his enthusiasm for playing snooker by the time of his accident. Whilst hospitalised, he accepted an offer from ITV to work as a television commentator, having previously worked in that role for the BBC and for STV. His book Tackle Snooker This Way was published in 1965 and revised and published as Tackle Snooker in 1974.

Pulman fell down stairs at home whilst his girlfriend was away, and was unable to move for almost 24 hours. He was transferred to hospital and died soon afterwards, on Christmas Day 1998.

Performance and rankings timeline 
Post-war

Modern era

Career finals

Amateur (1 title)

Non-ranking finals: 24 (14 titles)

Notes

References

Sources 
 

English snooker players
Snooker writers and broadcasters
1923 births
1998 deaths
Winners of the professional snooker world championship
Accidental deaths in England
British Army personnel of World War II
Accidental deaths from falls